William Edmond McKoy (born July 17, 1948) is a former American football linebacker. 

McKoy was born in Winston-Salem, North Carolina, in 1948. He played college football at Purdue. He was selected by both the Associated Press and United Press International as a second-team end on the 1969 All-Big Ten Conference football team.

He played professional in the National Football League (NFL) as a linebacker for the Denver Broncos from 1970 to 1972. He was traded to the Houston Oilers in July 1973.  He did not appear in any NFL games during the 1973 season. In 1974, he played for the San Francisco 49ers. He appeared in 44 NFL games, nine as a starter.

References

1948 births
Living people
American football linebackers
Purdue Boilermakers football players
Denver Broncos players
Players of American football from Winston-Salem, North Carolina
San Francisco 49ers players